The Women's National Invitation Tournament (WNIT) is a women's national college basketball tournament with a preseason and postseason version played every year. It is operated in a similar fashion to the men's college National Invitation Tournament (NIT) and NIT Season Tip-Off. Unlike the NIT, the women's tournament is not run by the National Collegiate Athletic Association (NCAA), but is an independent national championship. Triple Crown Sports, a company based in Fort Collins, Colorado that specializes in the promotion of amateur sporting events, created the WNIT in 1994 as a preseason counterpart to the then-current National Women's Invitational Tournament (NWIT). After the NWIT folded in 1996, Triple Crown Sports resurrected the postseason version in 1998 under the NWIT name, but changed the following season to the current name.

Format

Preseason
The WNIT began in 1994 as a 16-team preseason tournament; the preseason version has remained at that field size throughout its history except for the 2021 event, which was reduced to eight teams due to ongoing COVID-19 issues. Originally, the preseason WNIT was a single-elimination tournament, but since the 2007 edition has used a format which guarantees all participating teams three games. Since it is classified by the NCAA as an "exempt" event, a team can only participate in the preseason WNIT once every four years; additionally, only one team per conference may participate.

The 2021 event involved eight teams divided into four-team pods, one hosted by Kansas State and the other by NC State. Each team played a full round-robin within its pod, followed by Kansas State traveling to NC State for a final game. No overall champion was crowned, and a separate all-tournament team was named for each pod. It returned to 16 teams for 2022 and hereafter.

Postseason
The postseason WNIT started in 1998 as a 16-team tournament. It was doubled to a 32-team tournament in 1999, and once more in 2021. In 2006, competing schools assumed more responsibility, hosting the early rounds of the tourney, and additional expansion was made to forty teams.  At that time, schools which won their regular-season conference title but were excluded from the NCAA tournament by having lost their conference tournament were awarded automatic bids. The field was further expanded in 2007 to 48 teams, with automatic bids awarded to each Division I conference.  The tournament was expanded to its current 64 teams in 2010.

The postseason field consists of 32 automatic berths – one from each conference – and 32 at-large teams. Thirty-two spots in the Postseason WNIT are filled automatically by the best item available in each of the nation's 32 conferences. If a conference's automatic qualifier team declines the WNIT invitation, the conference forfeits that automatic spot, and that selection goes into the pool of at-large schools. The remaining 32 team slots in the Postseason WNIT are filled by the top teams available. Any team from a Division I conference, or a Division I independent team, will be considered. Any team considered for an at-large berth must have an overall record of .500 or better. The format won't affect the WNIT's automatic bid to any regular season conference  champion not making the 68-team field, since 2022. Bids are announced on the evening of the same day that the NCAA tourney bids are made.

The current 64-team tournament has 32 first-round games, followed by 16 second-round games, eight third-round games, four quarterfinal games, two semifinal games, and the championship. Since the WNIT is a for-profit tournament, all games are played on the site of the higher bidding team. The national championship game is currently carried on CBS Sports Network. Teams can host in the first round for a guarantee of $6,500 a game and in the second round for $7,500 a game. Early-round pairings are regionalized as much as possible in order to minimize missed class time and travel costs.

Championship history

Postseason 

*Was called National Women's Invitational Tournament.

Preseason

See also
 NCAA Division I women's basketball tournament
 Women's Basketball Invitational
 National Women's Invitational Tournament

References

External links
 

Postseason college basketball competitions in the United States
Recurring sporting events established in 1998
 
College women's basketball competitions in the United States
College basketball competitions